Sean Sabetkar (born 28 April 1995) is a Swedish professional footballer who plays as a centre-back for Allsvenskan club Degerfors IF.

Club career
Sabetkar made his Allsvenskan debut for Degerfors IF on 12 April 2021 against AIK during the 2021 season.

Career statistics

Club

References 

1995 births
Living people
Swedish footballers
Swedish people of Iranian descent
Sportspeople of Iranian descent
Association football defenders
AIK Fotboll players
Vasalunds IF players
Sollentuna FK players
Västerås SK Fotboll players
Degerfors IF players
Ettan Fotboll players
Superettan players
Allsvenskan players